The women's 5000 metres event at the 2008 World Junior Championships in Athletics was held in Bydgoszcz, Poland, at Zawisza Stadium on 8 July.

Medalists

Results

Final
8 July

Participation
According to an unofficial count, 12 athletes from 8 countries participated in the event.

References

5000 metres
Long distance running at the World Athletics U20 Championships
2008 in women's athletics